Flesh and the Woman is a 1954 French-Italian drama film directed by Robert Siodmak. It was entered into the 1954 Cannes Film Festival. It was released in the USA under the title Flesh and the Woman, and in the UK as The Card of Fate. It is a remake of the 1934 film Le Grand Jeu.

Plot
After an affair with a young woman named Sylvia the Frenchman Pierre Martel leaves Paris and goes to Algeria because he wants to start over. His wife refuses to follow him. Dismayed about all this he decides to join the French Foreign Legion. As a soldier he runs into a look-alike of Sylvia.

Cast

References

External links
 

1954 films
1954 drama films
French drama films
1950s French-language films
French black-and-white films
Films directed by Robert Siodmak
Films set in Algeria
Films set in deserts
Films set in the French colonial empire
Films about the French Foreign Legion
Remakes of French films
Italian drama films
Italian black-and-white films
1950s French films
1950s Italian films